The Winding Road is a 1920 British silent crime film directed by Bert Haldane and Frank Wilson and starring Cecil Humphreys, Edith Pearson and Annesley Healy. The screenplay concerns an army officer who is cashiered for forgery, but later is granted his freedom after saving a warden from rioting prisoners.

Cast
 Cecil Humphreys as Major Gawthorne  
 Edith Pearson as Ruth Gledhill 
 Annesley Healy as Jack Gledhill 
 Jack Jarman as Lieutenant Chatterton 
 Dorothy Cecil as Hon. Mrs. Dunoyne  
 Moore Marriott as Jed Sterrett

References

Bibliography
 Low, Rachael. History of the British Film, 1918-1929. George Allen & Unwin, 1971.

External links

1920 films
1920 crime films
British silent feature films
British crime films
Films directed by Bert Haldane
British black-and-white films
1920s English-language films
1920s British films